Johann Wilhelm Hittorf (27 March 1824 – 28 November 1914) was a German physicist who was born in Bonn and died in Münster, Germany.

Hittorf was the first to compute the electricity-carrying capacity of charged atoms and molecules (ions), an important factor in understanding electrochemical reactions. He formulated ion transport numbers and the first method for their measurements.

He observed tubes with energy rays extending from a negative electrode. These rays produced a fluorescence when they hit the glass walls of the tubes. In 1876 the effect was named "cathode rays" by Eugen Goldstein.

Hittorf's early investigations were on the allotropes of phosphorus and selenium. Between 1853 and 1859 his most important work was on ion movement caused by electric current. In 1853 Hittorf pointed out that some ions traveled more rapidly than others. This observation led to the concept of transport number, the fraction of the electric current carried by each ionic species. He measured the changes in the concentration of electrolyzed solutions, computed from these the transport numbers (relative carrying capacities) of many ions, and, in 1869, published his laws governing the migration of ions.

He became professor of physics and chemistry at the University of Münster and director of laboratories there from 1879 until 1889. He also investigated the light spectra of gases and vapours, worked on the passage of electricity through gases, and discovered new properties of cathode rays (electron rays). In 1869 he ascertained that the cathode rays glowed different colours because of different gasses and pressures. He noticed that when there was any object placed between the cathode and the illuminating side of the tube, then the shadow of that object appeared.

His work led toward development of X-rays and cathode ray tubes. The measurement of current in a vacuum tube was an important step towards the creation of a vacuum tube diode.

References

Further reading
Biographical sketch and reprint of paper on migration of ions

External links

The Cathode Ray Tube site

1824 births
1914 deaths
19th-century German physicists
Electrochemists
Recipients of the Pour le Mérite (civil class)
Scientists from Bonn